Luis de Ridder (23 February 1928 – 31 July 2004) was an Argentine alpine skier. He competed at the 1948 Winter Olympics and the 1952 Winter Olympics.

References

1928 births
2004 deaths
Argentine male alpine skiers
Olympic alpine skiers of Argentina
Alpine skiers at the 1948 Winter Olympics
Alpine skiers at the 1952 Winter Olympics
Skiers from Buenos Aires